Western Stima Football Club is a Kenyan football club based in Kakamega.  The team play their home games primarily at the Bukhungu Stadium, but also at the Moi Stadium. Western Stima currently compete in the Kenyan Premier League.

The team joined the Kenya Premier League in 2008 and was relegated in 2017, but were promoted back in the 2018 season.

Achievements
KPL Top 8 Cup: 0
2011 – Runners-up

References

Kenyan Premier League clubs
Football clubs in Kenya
Sport in Western Province (Kenya)
1997 establishments in Kenya